Annallur  is a village in Thrissur district in the state of Kerala, India.

Demographics
 India census, Annallur had a population of 6,254 with 3,050 males and 3,204 females.

References

Villages in Thrissur district